There have been many notable wildfires in Oregon history.

List
 1902
 Yacolt Burn
 1933–1951
 Tillamook Burn 1933, 1939, 1945 
 Bandon Fire (1936) 
 1996
 Simnasho 
 Ashwood-Donnybrook fire 
 2000
 Jackson Fire 
 2001
 Lakeview Complex 
 2002
 Biscuit Fire
 Toolbox Complex fires 
 2003
 B&B Complex fires
 2006
 South End Complex 
 2007
 Egley Complex 
 2009
 Tumblebug Complex Fire
 2011
 High Cascades Complex 
 2012
 Barry Point Fire
 Lava Fire
 Long Draw Fire
 Holloway Fire 
 Miller Homestead 
 2014
 Buzzard Complex 
 2015
 2017
 Chetco Bar Fire
 Cinder Butte Fire
 Eagle Creek Fire
 High Cascades Complex fires
 Jones Fire
 Milli Fire
 Nash Fire
 Whitewater Fire
 2018
 Boxcar Fire
 Graham Fire
 Jack Knife Fire
 Klamathon Fire
 Klondike Fire
 Long Hollow Fire
 Miles Fire
 South Valley Fire
 Substation Fire
 Whitewater Fire
 2020 (Western U.S.)
 Holiday Farm Fire
 Santiam Fire
 Slater and Devil fires
 2021
 Bootleg Fire
 Jack Fire
 Joseph Canyon Fire
2022
Cedar Creek Fire

References

Wildfires
Wildfires in Oregon
Lists of wildfires in the United States